The 2019–20 LSU Lady Tigers basketball team represents Louisiana State University during the 2019–20 NCAA Division I women's basketball season. The Lady Tigers, led by ninth-year head coach Nikki Fargas, play their home games at the Pete Maravich Assembly Center and compete as members of the Southeastern Conference (SEC).

Preseason

SEC media poll
The SEC media poll was released on October 15, 2019.

Roster

Schedule

|-
!colspan=9 style=| Exhibition

|-
!colspan=9 style=| Non-conference regular season

|-
!colspan=9 style=| SEC regular season

|-
!colspan=9 style=| SEC Tournament

References

LSU Lady Tigers basketball seasons
LSU
LSU Lady Tigers
LSU Lady Tigers